Hugh Glasgow (September 8, 1769January 31, 1818) was a member of the U.S. House of Representatives from Pennsylvania.

Biography
Hugh Glasgow was born in East Nottingham Township in the Province of Pennsylvania. He engaged in agricultural pursuits. He studied law, was admitted to the bar and practiced. He was judge of York County, Pennsylvania, from July 1, 1800, to March 29, 1813.

Glasgow was elected as a Republican to the Thirteenth and Fourteenth Congresses. He died at Peach Bottom, Pennsylvania and was interred at Slate Ridge Burying Ground.

References

Sources

The Political Graveyard

1769 births
1818 deaths
Pennsylvania lawyers
Pennsylvania state court judges
People from York County, Pennsylvania
Democratic-Republican Party members of the United States House of Representatives from Pennsylvania
People of colonial Pennsylvania
19th-century American lawyers